Eight ships of the Royal Navy have been named HMS Portland, either after Portland Harbour in Dorset or after holders of the title of the Duke of Portland:

  was a 50-gun fourth rate launched at Wapping in 1653 and burnt to avoid capture in 1692.
  was a 48-gun fourth rate launched in 1693, rebuilt in 1723 and broken up in 1743.
  was a 50-gun fourth rate launched in 1744 and sold in 1763.
  was a 50-gun fourth rate launched in 1770.  She was converted to a 10-gun storeship in 1800 and a prison ship in 1802. She was sold in 1817.
  was a barge probably used to defend Plymouth. She was purchased in 1795 and was sold on 29 December 1799 for £155.
  was a 52-gun fourth rate launched in 1822. She was to have been named HMS Kingston, but this was changed before launch in 1817.  She was sold in 1862.
She was laid down in 1941 and renamed  later that year. The Americans sank her in 1945.
  is a Type 23 frigate launched in 1999 and currently in service.

Battle honours
Ships named Portland have earned the following battle honours:
Scheveningen 1653
Lowestoft 1665
Four Days' Battle 1666
Orfordness 1666
Coventry 1709
Auguste 1746
Ushant 1747
Magnanime 1748
Lagos 1759
Quiberon Bay 1759

See also
  was a repair ship launched in 1945 and sold into civilian service in 1951, where she was renamed Zinnia.

Citations

Royal Navy ship names